Leo Delperdang (born February 18, 1962) is an American politician. He has served as a Republican member for the 94th district in the Kansas House of Representatives since 2017. He and his wife have two sons. He has an engineering degree and a Masters of Business Administration degree. He has been active in the Kansas Patriot Guard and his local west-side Wichita neighborhood association. He was endorsed by Kansans for Life, the National Rifle Association, the Wichita Chamber of Commerce and the Wichita Builders Association.

References

External links
Vote Smart

1962 births
Living people
Republican Party members of the Kansas House of Representatives
21st-century American politicians
Newman University, Wichita alumni
University of Nebraska Omaha alumni
Iowa Western Community College alumni
Politicians from Sioux City, Iowa